Rax King is an American writer.

Career

King’s essay about watching Diners, Drive-ins and Dives while healing from an abusive marriage was nominated for the James Beard Award. She hosts a podcast, Low Culture Boil, and her writing can be found in publications like Glamour and MEL Magazine.

Personal life
King lives in Brooklyn, New York.

Bibliography 
 2021: Tacky (essay collection)
 2018: The People's Elbow (chapbook)

References 

Year of birth missing (living people)
Living people
Place of birth missing (living people)
Writers from Brooklyn
American essayists
American women essayists
American podcasters
American women podcasters
21st-century American women